Bamberg is a Landkreis (district) in Bavaria, Germany. It surrounds but does not include the town of Bamberg. The district is bounded by the districts of (from the north and clockwise) Lichtenfels, Bayreuth, Forchheim, Erlangen-Höchstadt, Neustadt (Aisch)-Bad Windsheim, Kitzingen, Schweinfurt and Haßberge.

History 
The history of the district is linked with the history of Bamberg.

In 1862 the districts of Bamberg-West and Bamberg-East were established. They were merged in 1929. The present borders were established in 1972, when portions of the adjoining district of Erlangen-Höchstadt were annexed.

Geography 
The district surrounds the town of Bamberg. The western half of the district is occupied by the Steigerwald, a hilly forest region. In the east there is the hill chain of the Franconian Jura. Between these regions the Main river enters the district from the north, turns around just before the town of Bamberg and leaves to the northwest. The smaller Regnitz river comes from the south and flows into the Main at Bamberg.

Coat of arms 
The coat of arms displays the heraldic animals of Bamberg and Ebrach, a lion and a boar.

Sights

Towns and municipalities 

(populations as of 2007)

Towns

Market Towns

Municipalities

Verwaltungsgemeinschaften (Collective Municipalities)

References

External links 

Official website (German)
Links to municipalities

 
Districts of Bavaria